Science is the fourth album released by the Norwegian singer/songwriter Thomas Dybdahl.

Track listing
"Something Real" – 4:00
"How It Feels" – 3:06
"Still My Body Aches" – 3:40
"No One Would Ever Know" – 3:30
"Dice" – 1:54
"Always" – 4:28
"U" – 4:14
"This Year" – 4:19
"Maury The Pawn" – 3:56
"Outro" – 4:02
"B A Part" – 3:25

Bonus tracks
"Everybody Knows" – 2:59 (iTunes bonus track)

References

2006 albums
Thomas Dybdahl albums